Tawr (Tawn Chin), or Laamtuk Thet, is a Kuki-Chin language spoken in two villages of Hakha Township, Chin State, Myanmar.

VanBik (2009:48) proposes the name Laamtuk Thet (from the speakers' autonym Thet), and notes that Thawr is in fact a derogatory exonym that means ‘dirty’ or ‘sour’ in Hakha. It is spoken in Laamtuk and Ruavaan villages, located about 60 miles southeast of Hakha town (VanBik 2009:48).

References

VanBik, Kenneth. 2009. Proto-Kuki-Chin: A Reconstructed Ancestor of the Kuki-Chin Languages. STEDT Monograph 8. .

Kuki-Chin languages